Thomas Monroe Campbell (1883–1956) was the first Cooperative Extension Agent in the United States and headed the first Extension Program as a field agent for the U.S. Department of Agriculture. Well known for his work under the tutelage of Booker T. Washington and peered with George Washington Carver, Campbell was also the winner of the Harmon Award in 1930  for his service in the field of agriculture and author of the book The Movable School Goes to the Negro Farmer. He was a nationally known and well respected public servant of the first rank. A bust of Campbell can be found in the Tuskegee University Library.

Campbell and his wife Anna had six children; their fourth child was Col. William A. Campbell, who became a highly decorated member of the Tuskegee Airmen.

References

External links
 Thomas Monroe Campbell. Encyclopedia of Alabama.
 Thomas Monroe Campbell. Tuskegee University.

African-American people
Alabama Cooperative Extension System
1883 births
1956 deaths